Malta–Spain relations refer to foreign relations between Malta and Spain.  Both countries established mutual diplomatic relations in 1977. Malta has an embassy in Madrid and 5 honorary consulates (in Barcelona, Palma de Mallorca, Santander, Seville and Valencia). Spain has an embassy in Ta' Xbiex and Cultural Centre in Balzan.
Both countries are full members of the European Union and of the Union for the Mediterranean. In 2019, both countries celebrated 50 years of relations, highlighting "the strong cultural and historical ties" of both countries and their contribution to the European Union and the Mediterranean.

History

It was in the year 1530 when Emperor Charles I, as King of Aragon and Sicily, ceded the sovereignty of this island to the Knights of the Order of Saint John, who since then have been known as the Order of Malta. And so that the knights would not forget the monarch's gesture of generosity, the famous tribute of the Maltese Falcon was instituted by the Order of Malta, the old tribute that this historic institution dedicated to the Hispanic crown.

Migration issues

In December 2008, the two countries agreed to collaborate on issues relating to illegal migration, including repatriation. In a meeting between Home Affairs Minister Carmelo Mifsud Bonnici and his Spanish counterpart Alfredo Perez Rubalcaba, they agreed that the implementation of the Immigration and Asylum Pact was a priority. The two countries agreed that a group of Spanish police should be sent to Malta in 2009 to help the Maltese force with repatriation.

In February 2022, Malta agreed to introduce migratory policy in the Southern Neighborhood.

Agreements
In January 2007, the two countries entered into a tax treaty.

See also
 Foreign relations of Malta
 Foreign relations of Spain

References

External links
  List of Maltese representations in Spain 
  Spanish embassy in Valletta (in Spanish only)

 
Spain
Bilateral relations of Spain